The Star and Garter is a pub in Manchester, England, with a room upstairs for club nights and gigs, on Fairfield Street behind Piccadilly railway station. If  has been a Grade II listed building since 1988.

Origins of the name
The name "Star and Garter" originates from an abbreviation of the name of the insignia belonging to Order of the Garter. The Star is eight pointed and of chipped silver. At its centre is a white enamelled medallion bearing the Cross of St George in red enamel and surrounded by a dark blue enamelled Garter edged with gold bearing the motto in gold letters.

Several English pubs are named the Star and Garter.

History of the building
According to both popular myth, legend and at least two long since out-of-print local history tomes, the Star and Garter was built in 1803 approximately 100 yards from its current position. When Store Street/Bank Top/London Road railway station (the original names of Manchester Piccadilly station) was expanded with the addition of the connecting line to Oxford Road station in 1849, the Star and Garter was moved, brick by brick, onto its current site and reopened in 1877. Originally built as a hotel, although it did brew its own beer as well, the Star and Garter has since been transformed into a pub and club venue, although due to its listed status there are still many restrictions on how the structure of the building can be altered.

The building survived the Manchester Blitz, suffering firebomb damage to the roof which was fortunate considering that London Road (Piccadilly) Railway Station was a major target for the bombers.

While Mayfield and Piccadilly Stations were both active the Star and Garter operated very profitably as a pub which catered for railway workers and later on Post Office workers when Parcel Force opened a warehouse on Travis Street which was linked to Mayfield Station via a conveyor belt which spanned Fairfield Street. In 1987 Mayfield Railway Station closed and fell rapidly into disrepair which in turn promopted Chester’s Brewery to close The Star and Garter due to lack of business. The whole area around Mayfield Station followed suit and became almost derelict in parts and marked the beginnings of the area becoming a red light area.

In 1990 the Star and Garter was purchased privately and the upstairs space renovated with a bar added - in 1991 it reopened as a live music venue. After planning permission was granted a fire escape was added and a late licence was issued so the Star and Garter became both a music venue and nightclub. Unfortunately the ludicrous conditions of the late licence meant that some beautiful ornate seating downstairs had to be removed to comply with said conditions.

Film Location
The Star and Garter has been used as a location in the following productions;
Band of Gold, Cracker, 
Prime Suspect,
There’s Only One Jimmy Grimble,
Mine All Mine,
Prey,
Dead Clever,
The Body Farm,
Cradle to Grave, 
Worried About the Boy,
Snodgrass,
It’s A Sin,
Brassic,
Eggs Get A Round

References

External links
 http://www.starandgarter.co.uk - Homepage featuring gig guide and location details
 https://www.facebook.com/StarAndGarterManchester - Facebook Pages

Pubs in Manchester
Grade II listed buildings in Manchester